Telly Inc (formerly Twitvid Inc) is a Kuwait based company that operates a video discovery platform and offers video streaming services in the Middle East and North Africa. The platform also features Bollywood films and locally produced content, TV shows and exclusive Original contents as well as Kuwaiti Short Films on their website.

History
Telly Inc, formerly Twitvid Inc, was founded in 2009 in the United States. The company primarily serves Saudi Arabia, Bahrain, the United Arab Emirates, Kuwait, Qatar, Oman, Lebanon, Jordan, Egypt, Morocco, Algeria, Tunisia, Iraq, and Yemen with local presence and offices in Kuwait & Dubai.

After its launch in 2012, Telly Plus made social recommendations for videos that a visitor's social contacts may have been watching. Telly claims to have had about 115 million views in February and has raised a cumulative of $20 million from different investors such as DFJ, Lumia Capital and Azure Capital with a majority stakes by Cinemagics in Kuwait, one of the leading production companies in the region, in a move to revolutionize and change the behavior of audience in the GCC region. With the knowledge that no one had yet cracked the video-on-demand market in the middle east, Telly Plus and Icflix became the main competitors when they entered a fragmented market affected by piracy and little investment yet with 14.5 million hours of videos are watched per day. Telly soon signed deals with Sony Pictures Television, Samsung mobile and Miramax as well as independent content owners for more than 1,000 television shows and films.

In 2013, Telly acquired Sha-Sha (شاشا), which was dubbed as the Netflix of the middle east, to serve video streaming to the Arab world. Later, Telly teamed up with Telfaz 11, Saudi Arabia's primary Internet television network, to cater this customer base for a first window before the show hits YouTube.

Services
The company has signed up with major studios like Sony Pictures for series like Breaking Bad and films like The Social Network and There Will Be Blood. Telly has been reported to leverage the trend of smart TVs and smartphones in emerging markets, an approach that has also been cited for Netflix. Telly has hence been mainly serving these two types of customers that prefer to stream videos online. This service has specifically been cited to be enabled in Panasonic Smart TVs as a pre-loaded service to market to middle east with Hollywood and Arabic movies and TV shows.

Telly mainly generates revenue mainly from subscription based services as opposed to advertising to avoid losing customers to interruptions caused by the adverts, however, their business model is considered to be facing a competition by video piracy.

In June 2015, co-produced with Cinemagics A Song in her eyes starred by Haya Abdul Salam & Fouwad Ali. This is the first move towards original production and programming for Telly. According to Bloomberg L.P., Telly Partnered with Kuwait TV, KTV. In 2016, Telly expanded into television production, and produced its 1st Original Online series exclusively for Telly Plus Subscribers, The name of the series was “After the End”, which was executed by Cinemagic.

External links

See also
 Comparison between OTT and IPTV
 Digital television

References

Companies of Kuwait
Kuwaiti brands
Video on demand services